Blier is a surname, which stemmed from the French name Belier. The term is symbolic with powerful, forceful person, from bélier ‘ram’, ‘battering ram’ Notable people with the surname include:

Bernard Blier (1916–1989), French actor
Bertrand Blier (born 1939), French screenwriter and film director
Suzanne Blier (born 1948), American art historian